Liu Yongzhi (born November 1944) is a general in the People's Liberation Army (PLA) of the People's Republic of China. He served as vice director of the PLA General Political Department.

Biography

Born in Yanling County, Henan Province, Liu joined the Communist Party of China (CPC) in November 1963. 

In April 1999, he was appointed to be the director of the political department and a standing committee member of the CPC committee of the Nanjing Military Region. In December 2000, he became the vice political commissar of the Region. In October 2002, he was transferred to the Lanzhou Military Region and promoted to political commissar and secretary of the CPC committee there. Since December 2004, he has served as vice director of the PLA General Political Department and as a member of its CPC committee. 

Liu attained the rank of major general in June 1991, lieutenant general in July 2000, and general on June 24, 2006. He was a member of the 16th and 17th Central Committee of the Communist Party of China.

References

1944 births
People's Liberation Army generals from Henan
Living people
Politicians from Xuchang
Chinese Communist Party politicians from Henan
People's Republic of China politicians from Henan
Members of the 16th Central Committee of the Chinese Communist Party
Members of the 17th Central Committee of the Chinese Communist Party